Carlos Isaac (9 June 1924 – 3 September 2000) was an Argentine sprinter. He represented Argentina at the 1948 Summer Olympics in London. Isaac was born in Gualeguaychu, Argentina on 9 June 1924. He was entered in the 100 m and the 4x100 m relay, but did not advance past the heats in either. His personal best for 100m was 10.5 seconds, set in 1943. Issac died in Rosario, Argentina on 3 September 2000, at the age of 76.

References
Carlos Isaac's profile at Sports Reference.com

External links
  

1924 births
2000 deaths
Argentine male sprinters
Athletes (track and field) at the 1948 Summer Olympics
Olympic athletes of Argentina
20th-century Argentine people